Lilavati Munshi was an Indian politician and Gujarati essayist. She was a member of the Bombay Legislative Assembly from 1937 to 1946 and the Rajya Sabha from 1952 to 1958 as a member of the Indian National Congress. She wrote essays and sketches.

Biography 
Lilavati was born on 21 May 1899 in a Gujarati Jain family of Keshavlal.

Since the 1920s, she was associated with the Indian independence movement. She participated in the Salt Satyagraha and the Civil Disobedience Movement. She was imprisoned by the British authorities for her activism.

In the 1950s, she founded the Society for the Prevention of Unhealthy Trends in Motion Pictures in Bombay. In 1954, she moved a resolution to prohibit screening of 'undesirable' films and obscene scenes, which was adopted by the House following which the government amended the Cinematograph Act in 1959. Kissing scenes were not uncommon in Indian films till the 1950s; it was largely due to her movement that they vanished.

She was a member of  erstwhile Bombay Legislative Assembly from 1937 to 1946. She served as a member of the Rajya Sabha, the upper house  of the Parliament of India from 3 April 1952 to 2 April 1958 representing Bombay State  as a member of the Indian National Congress.

She died on 20 February 1978.

Literary works
She contributed significantly in the field of character sketches and personal essays. Rekhachitro ane Bija Lekho, a collection of character sketches, was published in 1925. It consists of character sketches of mythical, historical and literary personalities and of contemporary men and women, mostly Gujaratis. Vadhu Rekhachitro (1935) included some more sketches. Kumardevi, a collection of her essays, was published in 1929. Her short stories and short plays were collected in Javan Ni Vate (1977). Sanchaya (1975) is the compilation of articles written by her.

Personal life 
Her first marriage was to Lalbhai Sheth. After he died in 1926, she married Gujarati writer Kanaiyalal Maneklal Munshi. They had two sons and four daughters.

See also 

 List of Gujarati-language writers

References

External links
 

1899 births
1978 deaths
Rajya Sabha members from Maharashtra
Indian National Congress politicians
Gujarati people
Gujarati-language writers
Indian essayists
Women members of the Rajya Sabha
People from Mumbai
20th-century Indian Jains
Indian women essayists